Wilkowyja may refer to the following places:
Wilkowyja, Gniezno County in Greater Poland Voivodeship (west-central Poland)
Wilkowyja, Łask County in Łódź Voivodeship (central Poland)
Wilkowyja, Masovian Voivodeship (east-central Poland)
Wilkowyja, Jarocin County in Greater Poland Voivodeship (west-central Poland)